Ram Pratap Garg (born 18 September 1917, date of death unknown) was an Indian politician. He was elected to the Lok Sabha, lower house of the Parliament of India as a member of the Indian National Congress. Garg is deceased.

References

External links
 Official biographical sketch in Parliament of India website

1917 births
Year of death missing
India MPs 1952–1957
Indian National Congress politicians
Lok Sabha members from Punjab, India